Darreh Bagh (also Romanized as Darreh Bāgh; also known as Dār Bāgh and Dār-i-Bāgh) is a village in Japelaq-e Sharqi Rural District, Japelaq District, Azna County, Lorestan Province, Iran. At the 2006 census, its population was 140, in 33 families.

References 

Towns and villages in Azna County